Brodequin is an American death metal band from Knoxville, Tennessee, United States. Formed in 1998 by brothers Mike and Jamie Bailey, the band has released three albums and two EPs to date, their latest release being Perpetuation of Suffering, which was released on August 31, 2021.

Themes
The name Brodequin was chosen by Jamie Bailey, after the medieval torture device of the same name. Torture devices in general are referred to frequently in the group's lyrical content. While lyrics describing dismemberment, torture, murder, and abuse are unsurprising in death metal, Brodequin is unusual in exploring such phenomena within a historical context. Jamie Bailey is a history graduate and most of his lyrics are inspired by real historical events.

Members

Current members
 Jamie Bailey - bass, vocals 
 Mike Bailey - guitars 
 Joaquin Chavez - guitars 
 Brennan Shackelford - drums

Former members
 Chad Walls - drums 
 Jon Engman - drums 
 Henning Paulsen - drums 
 Jan Van Lugtenburg - drums

Discography

Studio Albums
 2000 - Instruments of Torture
 2001 - Festival of Death
 2004 - Methods of Execution

EPs
 2003 - Prelude to Execution
 2021 - Perpetuation of Suffering

Demo albums
 1999 - Brodequin

Split albums
 2002 - Created to Kill (with Drowning, Aborted, and Misery Index)
 2004 - Prelude to Execution/Stop the Madness (with Tears of Decay)

References

External links
Official Brodequin site
Unmatched Brutality Records
Metal Archives

Musical groups established in 1998
Deathgrind musical groups
Heavy metal musical groups from Tennessee
American musical trios
Musical groups from Knoxville, Tennessee
1998 establishments in Tennessee